James William Barnes Steveni (born 1859 in Kingston upon Hull, Great Britain; died 1944 in Bromsgrove, Great Britain) was a British journalist and author.

From 1887 he lived in Russia's capital Petersburg (after 1914 named Petrograd), where he taught English language and met Leo Tolstoy, for example. As a correspondent for the London Daily Chronicle in Petersburg between 1892 and 1917 he authored a number of books, essays and articles about political, military, social, cultural, ethnological and historical aspects of Russia's situation on the eve of the First World War and the Russian Revolution.

Publications 
 Through Famine-Stricken Russia (1892)
 The Scandinavian Question (1905)
 Things seen in Russia (1913)
 Petrograd, past and present (1914)
 The Russian army from within (1914)
 Things seen in Sweden (1915)
 How to do business with Russia; hints and advice to business men dealing with Russia (1917)
 Europe’s Great Calamity: The Russian Famine, An Appeal for the Russian Peasant (1922)
 Unknown Sweden (1925)

Sources 

1859 births
1944 deaths
People from Kingston upon Hull
People from Bromsgrove
19th-century British male writers
19th-century British non-fiction writers
20th-century British male writers
20th-century British non-fiction writers
19th-century British journalists
20th-century British journalists
British male journalists